Hosanna Meeting House, also known as the Hosanna A.U.M.P. Church, is a historic African American church near Oxford, Pennsylvania, United States, on the present-day campus of Lincoln University. Organized in 1843 and constructed by 1845, the Hosanna Meeting House was a station on the Underground Railroad and a primary place of worship for members of the free Black community of Hinsonville. A Pennsylvania state historical marker was placed at the church in 1992.

Architecture 
The Hosanna Meeting House is a small, one-room, one-story chapel constructed of red brick with a plain exterior, a shingled gable roof, and wooden front steps up to a wraparound porch. A hidden crawlspace beneath the floorboards once served as a hiding place for fugitive slaves. A small historic cemetery adjacent to the church was established in 1854 as one of Chester County's first marked grave sites for Black decedents. Along with other former congregants and veterans of various wars, seventeen African American veterans of the 54th Massachusetts Infantry Regiment are buried in the cemetery.

History 
Organized in 1843 and built by 1845, the Hosanna Meeting House is the last remaining structure from the village of Hinsonville, a free Black community formed prior to the American Civil War. Affiliated with the A.U.M.P. Church, Hosanna was a station on the Underground Railroad and hosted Frederick Douglass, Harriet Tubman, Sojourner Truth, and other visitors. To honor Hosanna's significance to the free Black community, the Pennsylvania Historical and Museum Commission placed a marker by Old U.S. Route 1 (Baltimore Pike) where the roadway passes the meeting house, dedicating the marker on May 9, 1992. 

As of 2015, the congregation consisted of fewer than twenty people. The church has remained a place of worship for Lincoln University's students and staff.

See also 

 List of Pennsylvania state historical markers in Chester County

References 

African-American history of Pennsylvania
A.U.M.P. Church
African-American churches
African Methodist Episcopal churches in Pennsylvania
Methodist churches in Pennsylvania
Churches completed in 1845
1845 establishments in Pennsylvania
Churches in Chester County, Pennsylvania
Cemeteries in Chester County, Pennsylvania
Churches on the Underground Railroad
Underground Railroad in Pennsylvania
Lincoln University (Pennsylvania)